Illuminatus of Arce or Illuminatus of Rieti (Illuminato da Rieti) was an earlier follower of Francis of Assisi.

Illuminatus was born around 1190, probably in Rocca Antica or Rocca Sinibalda, villages southwest of Rieti, or possibly in the region of Arce in the plain around Assisi. In 1219, during the Fifth Crusade, he accompanied Francis on his mission to the court of al-Kāmil, sultan of Egypt. In 1224, he was the first to spot the stigmata on Francis at La Verna. He convinced Francis to publicize the miracle. He was living at Greccio in 1246. He is reported to have died either in 1260–1262 or in 1266.

While earlier sources confirm that Francis had a companion in 1219, Bonaventure, in his Legenda maior, is the first to name him: "a brother named Illuminatus, a virtuous and enlightened man" (Illuminato nomine, viro utique luminis et virtutis). It has been speculated that Illuminatus was one of Bonaventure's informants. A letter appended to the Legenda trium sociorum names Illuminatus as a source. Although this Legenda was written in the 1240s, the earliest manuscript dates to 1311 and the letter may be a later addition, perhaps influenced by Bonaventure. It has even been suggested that Bonaventure invented the name Illuminatus ('enlightened one') because he did not know the companion's actual name. There is, however, a 14th-century compilation of Franciscan exempla that includes one attributed to Illuminatus.

In the Divine Comedy of Dante Alighieri, Illuminatus is pictured in the Heaven of the Sun, among the teachers and mystics of the second garland of souls (Paradiso 12.130).

Illuminatus of Arce is sometimes confused with Bishop Illuminatus of Assisi.

Notes

Bibliography

12th-century births
1260s deaths
People from Rieti
Italian Franciscans
Franciscan missionaries
Christians of the Fifth Crusade
Characters in the Divine Comedy